Air Chief Marshal Sir Robert James Michael Alcock,  (born 11 July 1936), usually referred to as Sir Michael Alcock, is a retired senior Royal Air Force commander and an aerospace consultant.

RAF career
Educated at Victoria College, Jersey, Alcock was commissioned in the Technical Branch of the Royal Air Force in 1959.

By the time of the Gulf War, Alcock was Air Officer Engineering at Headquarters Strike Command.  He was appointed the RAF's Chief Engineer in 1991, and promoted to air chief marshal in 1993. The following year Alcock graduated from Cranfield University before being appointed Air Officer Commanding-in-Chief the newly established Logistics Command on 1 April 1994. The role also carried with it a seat on the Air Force Board as the Air Member for Logistics and Alcock became the first non-aircrew officer to sit on the Air Force Board. Additionally, Alcock continued to be designated as the RAF's Chief Engineer. Alcock was succeeded by Sir John Allison on 8 March 1996. He retired from the RAF on 25 June 1996, and subsequently worked as an aerospace consultant.

References

1936 births
Living people
Royal Air Force air marshals
People educated at Victoria College, Jersey
Knights Grand Cross of the Order of the Bath
Knights Commander of the Order of the British Empire
Fellows of the Royal Academy of Engineering
Fellows of the Royal Aeronautical Society